Jethmalani is a surname. Notable people with the surname include:

Ram Jethmalani (1923–2019), Indian lawyer and politician
Kamna Jethmalani (born 1985), Indian actress
Mahesh Jethmalani (born 1956), Indian lawyer and politician

Indian surnames